The discography of Sam Brown  consists of seven studio albums, one live album, one EP, and three compilation albums.

A curious element of Brown's discography is that her studio and live albums' first letters (ignoring the "43" in 43 Minutes) spell out the her full name (with "N" being the most recent initial). Brown was unaware of this coincidence until a fan spotted this on the release of ReBoot, after which Brown led an online campaign for fans to name her next album beginning with "O."

Albums

Studio albums

Live albums

Compilation albums

Extended play

Singles

References

Discographies of British artists
Pop music discographies